Takanluy may refer to:
 Takanluy-e Olya
 Takanluy-e Sofla